Deh Zir (also Romanized as Deh Zīr) is a village in Alaviyeh Rural District, Kordian District, Jahrom County, Fars Province, Iran. At the 2006 census, its population was 2,261, in 577 families.

References 

Populated places in Jahrom County